Miss World 2010, the 60th anniversary of the Miss World pageant, was held on 30 October 2010 at the Crown of Beauty Theatre in Sanya, China after Vietnam backed out of the hosting contract. 121 contestants from all over the world competed for the crown. Kaiane Aldorino of Gibraltar crowned her successor Alexandria Mills of the United States at end of the event.

Results

Placements

Continental Queens of Beauty

Order of Announcements

Top 25

 Top 7 

 Top 5

Contestants

Judges
The judges for Miss World 2010 were:

 Julia Morley – Chairwoman of the Miss World Organization
 Denise Perrier – Miss World 1953 from France
 Ann Sidney – Miss World 1964 from United Kingdom
 Mary Stävin – Miss World 1977 from Sweden
 Agbani Darego – Miss World 2001 from Nigeria
 María Julia Mantilla – Miss World 2004 from Peru
 Zhang Zilin – Miss World 2007 from China
 Ksenia Sukhinova – Miss World 2008 from Russia
 Krish Naidoo – Miss World International Ambassador
 Mike Dixon – Miss World Musical Director
 Zhao Benshan – Actor & Comedian
 Bruce Zhao – Chairperson of the Huayu Group
 Andrew Minarik – Miss World Make-Up & Hairdresser

It was reported that Beijing may have pressured the judges to provide low scores for Mariann Birkedal, Miss Norway, because the Nobel Peace Prize was awarded to one of its political prisoners, Liu Xiaobo. During the time of the pageant, relations between China and Norway were "very strained."

Notes

Returns

Last competed in 1988:
 
Last competed in 1997:
 
 
Last competed in 2003:
 
Last competed in 2005:
 
 
Last competed in 2008:

Withdrawals

Replacements
  – Carla Conrradi resigned as Miss Mundo Argentina. The 1st runner up, Marianna Arambarry was the new titleholder and Argentina's representative at Miss World 2010.
  – Due to a schedule conflict of competing in Miss Chinese International Pageant 2010, Toby Chan, Winner of Miss Hong Kong 2010, cannot participate in the competition. The 1st runner-up, Sammi Cheung was representative at Miss World 2010.
  – Ágnes Dobó was Miss World Hungary 2010 until she injured her arm and wrist. This stopped her from participating in the pageant. She was replaced by her second runner-up, Jennifer Kalo.
  – Due to a schedule conflict of competing in Miss Universe 2010, Miss Russia 2010, Irina Antonenko was unable to participate in the competition. The 1st runner-up, Irina Sharipova was appointed as the Russian representative at Miss World 2010.

Country Changes
 American Virgin Islands now competes as US Virgin Islands.

Venue

Vietnam backed out
On 8 June 2009, Mr. Hoang Kieu (RAAS Group Chairperson) and Mrs. Morley publicly agreed on Nha Trang as host for Miss World 2010.

According to a manager of the Tien Giang Tourism JS Company, RAAS bought 31 hectares in total to build a tourism site for Miss World 2010, which led to a public debate about some national ecological reserves being devastated and people having to leave their homes due to increasing living costs.

On 28 January 2010, RAAS told Khanh Hoa People's Committee office to announce that they were no longer organising the event without an official explanation on the debate. Khanh Hoa Province then decided to host Miss World with new sponsors. RAAS would return as the main sponsor if another province was assigned as host.

Finally on 2 April 2010, Deputy Prime Minister Nguyen Thien Nhan approved a proposal by the host province Khanh Hoa to back out of hosting Miss World.

Although Miss World 2010 was held in Sanya, China, RAAS Group was still in charge of the financial backing for the event. RAAS confirmed that Miss World would be back to Mỹ Tho, Tien Giang Province later in 2011 or 2012. However, according to many reliable newswire such as VnExpress, there is no way for Miss World being organised in Tien Giang Province in 2011 or 2012 under the umbrella of RAAS because Mr. Hoang Kieu owed the landlords in the province, involved in the tourism project millions of dollars,

References

Miss World
2010 beauty pageants
2010 in China
Beauty pageants in China
October 2010 events in China